The Parliament of the Northern Territory is the unicameral legislature of the Northern Territory of Australia. It consists of the Northern Territory Legislative Assembly and the Administrator of the Northern Territory, who represents the Governor-General. It is one of three unicameral parliaments in Australia, along with those of Queensland and the Australian Capital Territory. The Legislative Assembly replaced the previous Legislative Council in 1974. It sits in Parliament House, Darwin.

The leader of the party with the most seats in the Legislative Assembly is invited by the Administrator to form the Government of the Northern Territory. The head of the government is the Chief Minister.

Source of legislative powers
The Parliament of the Northern Territory, which comprises the Legislative Assembly and the Administrator, exercises the legislative power in the Territory which are similar to those of the Australian state parliaments. The Northern Territory (Administration) Act 1974 (Cth) granted self-government to the Territory. The federal government retains control of certain legislative areas, including Aboriginal land, industrial relations, national parks and uranium mining.

However, while the state parliaments derive their legislative powers from constitutional sources, the Northern Territory derives its legislative power from the delegation of powers from the Commonwealth. The Australian Parliament thus retains the right to legislate for the Territory, if it chooses to exercise it. This includes the power to override any legislation passed by the Northern Territory Parliament.

For example, in response to the Northern Territory Parliament's passage of the Rights of the Terminally Ill Act 1995, the Territory's voluntary euthanasia law, the federal Parliament passed the Euthanasia Laws Act 1997, which amended the laws granting self-government to the territories–in the Northern Territory's case, the Northern Territory (Self-Government) Act 1978–to remove that area from the legislative competences of the territories.

History
From 1911 to 1947 the laws of the Northern Territory were made by the Commonwealth Government.

In 1947 the Northern Territory (Administration) Act was amended to provide for a territory legislature. The first legislative council for the Northern Territory was created in Darwin in March 1948. It consisted of seven official members appointed by the Governor-General, six elected members and the administrator as president of the council.

In 1974 the Legislative Council was replaced by a fully elected Legislative Assembly with nineteen members.

From 1974 until 2001, the Assembly was controlled by the conservative Country Liberal Party, which is affiliated with the federal Liberal-National coalition. However, at the 2001 election, the Labor Party won government for the first time on a one-seat majority, with Clare Martin becoming the Territory's first Labor and first female Chief Minister. Labor won 19 seats to the CLP's 4 at the 2005 election. Martin resigned in 2007 with Paul Henderson becoming Labor leader, and retained government with another one-seat majority at the 2008 election. The CLP led by Terry Mills defeated Labor at the 2012 election with 16 seats to Labor's 8. Mills resigned in 2013 with Adam Giles becoming CLP leader. The CLP was reduced to a one-seat majority in 2014 when three CLP members defected to the Palmer United Party, however one later rejoined the CLP. After further defections, numbers fell to minority government status in July 2015.

The 2016 election saw a landslide CLP defeat which brought Labor to power led by Chief Minister Michael Gunner. The position of Speaker of the Northern Territory Legislative Assembly has been held by CLP-turned-independent MP Kezia Purick since 23 October 2012. Despite Labor's massive majority following the 2016 election, the incoming Labor government re-appointed Purick as Speaker.

In 2020, Purick's role as Speaker was revoked as a result of an ICAC investigation. Chansey Paech took the role, until the dissolution of parliament, which preceded the 2020 Northern Territory general election. Following this election, Paech resigned as Speaker on 7 September 2020 to become a minister in the Gunner cabinet. Deputy speaker Ngaree Ah Kit is currently acting speaker until the parliament resumes in October to elect a new presiding officer.

See also
 2020 Northern Territory general election
 Members of the Northern Territory Legislative Assembly, 2020–2024
 Northern Territory Government
 Northern Territory Legislative Assembly
 Northern Territory Legislative Council
 Parliament House, Darwin
 Parliaments of the Australian states and territories

Notes

References

External links
 https://parliament.nt.gov.au

 
Northern Territory
1974 establishments in Australia